The Sheltowee Trace Trail is a  National Recreation Trail that was created in 1979 and stretches from the Burnt Mill Bridge Trail Head in the Big South Fork National River and Recreation Area in Tennessee to northern Rowan County, Kentucky.  The trail is named after Daniel Boone, who was given the name Sheltowee (meaning "Big Turtle") when he was adopted as the son of the great warrior Chief Blackfish of the Shawnee tribe.

The trail is primarily in the Daniel Boone National Forest, but also takes visitors through the Big South Fork National River and Recreation Area, Cumberland Falls State Resort Park, Natural Bridge State Resort Park, two large recreation lakes (Cave Run Lake and Laurel Lake), and many wildlife management areas. All but the southernmost  are in Kentucky.

The trail is multi-use, with certain sections allowing horses, mountain bikes and all-terrain vehicles in some designated sections. Using off-road motorcycles, SUVs, 4x4, ATVs and even mountain bikes in certain areas can result in equipment confiscation and fines. 
While the southern terminus was moved in 2014, the trail into Pickett State Park remains open for those that wish to exit on that trail or wish to walk further down the scenic Rock Creek. The movement and addition of 10 miles of trail onto the Kentucky Trail in the Big South Fork in 2019 added 10 miles to the Trace's previous length of 323 miles.

References

External links
Sheltowee Trace National Recreation Trail, from a U.S. Forest Service website, including a map in PDF format
Mapping the Sheltowee, a GIS mapping website from a Lexington, Kentucky company
Sheltowee Trace Association, a group of volunteers that maintain the Trace

Hiking trails in Tennessee
Hiking trails in Kentucky
Landmarks in Kentucky
Long-distance trails in the United States
National Recreation Trails in Kentucky
National Recreation Trails in Tennessee